Ardente was the second and final member of the  of destroyers built for the Italian  in the 1910s.

Design

They had a crew of 4 officers and 65 enlisted men. The ships were powered by two Parsons steam turbines, with steam provided by four Thornycroft water-tube boilers.

The ship carried an armament that consisted of a single  gun and four  guns, along with two  torpedo tubes. The 102 mm gun was placed on the forecastle and the two of the 76 mm guns were mounted abreast the funnels, with the remaining pair at the stern. The torpedo tubes were in single mounts, both on the centerline.

Service history
Ardente was built at the  shipyard in Livorno, and was launched on 15 December 1912.

After the end of the war, the ship had her armament revised to five  35-cal. guns, a single  35-cal. gun, and a pair of  machine guns. The work was completed by 1920. Ardente was reclassified as a torpedo boat on 1 October 1929. She served well into the 1930s, before being struck from the naval register on 11 March 1937 and thereafter discarded.

Notes

References
 

Ardito-class destroyers
1912 ships